Lindamlilage Prageeth Chamara Silva (born 14 December 1979) is a former Sri Lankan cricketer, who played all formats of the game for 12 years. He is a right-handed batsman and a leg-break bowler. After poor performances, Silva was dropped from the squad, but continued to play in domestic seasons for Panadura Sports Club.

He has been compared with Aravinda de Silva due to his bow-legged stance. Silva was an important member of three World runner-up Sri Lanka teams in 2007, 2009 and 2011.

Early and domestic career
He was educated at the Panadura Royal College. Having set a steady record for his club Panadura, he captained the team and secured a good record including a 54 on his One Day International debut against Australia. Since 1998, he has played List A cricket and since 2004, Twenty20 cricket with moderate success and steady averages. He made his Twenty20 debut on 17 August 2004, for Sinhalese Sports Club in the 2004 SLC Twenty20 Tournament.

In March 2018, he was named in Colombo's squad for the 2017–18 Super Four Provincial Tournament. The following month, he was also named in Colombo's squad for the 2018 Super Provincial One Day Tournament. In March 2019, he was named in Colombo's squad for the 2019 Super Provincial One Day Tournament.

International career
He made his Test debut in New Zealand and had the worst possible start being dismissed for a pair just like his teammate Marvan Atapattu. He was given a second chance however and immediately justified his selection with an entertaining 61 in the first innings of the 2nd Test, enjoying a 121 run partnership with Kumar Sangakkara. In the second innings he improved further, making a very aggressive unbeaten 152, hitting 20 fours and batting right through with the tail (most notably Chaminda Vaas, putting on 88 runs together) before running out of partners.

Silva scored his first One Day International hundred against India just 3 weeks before the World Cup. His good form continued in the Cricket World Cup 2007, he managed to make 350 runs with an average of 43.75 with 4 half centuries and a highest score of 64. His success in the middle order has helped to give Sri Lanka a boost in their one-day and test sides particularly after veteran middle order batsmen Russel Arnold announced his retirement at the end of the World Cup.

Fixing allegations 
Chamara Silva has been banned from all forms of cricket from September 2017 for two years due to the alleged misconduct during a domestic first class cricket match between Panadura Cricket Club and Kalutara Physical Culture Club along with Manoj Deshapriya. Chamara Silva, the captain of the Panadura Cricket Club was found guilty for match-fixing allegations after the unusual scoring rate by Panadura side in a first class cricket match in January 2017.

References

1979 births
Living people
Sri Lanka One Day International cricketers
Sri Lanka Test cricketers
Sri Lanka Twenty20 International cricketers
Basnahira South cricketers
Sebastianites Cricket and Athletic Club cricketers
Panadura Sports Club cricketers
Sinhalese Sports Club cricketers
Deccan Chargers cricketers
Sri Lankan cricketers
Cricketers at the 2007 Cricket World Cup
Cricketers at the 2011 Cricket World Cup
Wayamba cricketers
Ruhuna cricketers
Ruhuna Royals cricketers
Sri Lanka Cricket Combined XI cricketers
Sportspeople involved in betting scandals
People from Panadura